The Hemigasteraceae are a family of fungi in the order Agaricales. The family is monotypic, containing the single genus Hemigaster, which in turn contains the single species H. candidus.

See also
List of Agaricales families

References

Agaricales families